Northern Heights is a suburban satellite locality of Murray Bridge in South Australia. Being set approximately  back from the west bank of the Murray River, the locality occupies higher ground immediately west of the Preamimma Creek, which separates it from Mobilong Swamp. The crest of Paradise Hill (formerly Hungry Hill) is at the northwestern corner of the locality.

See also
 List of cities and towns in South Australia

References 

Towns in South Australia